Muttar is a village in upper Kuttanad, Alappuzha district of Kerala, India. It is located 10 km west of Thiruvalla on the Kidangara Neerattupuram (Muttar Central) road, surrounded by Thalavady, Neerettupuram, Kunnamkary, Chathamkary  & Mithrakary.

Geography
The River Manimala flows on the east of the village. The village has several coconut plantations and paddy fields. Pin Code of Muttar is 689574 which comes under tiruvalla postal division (Kerala Circle) The paddy is cultivated about 5 ft below sea level.

Places of worship
The oldest place of worship in Muttar is the Kochukodungalloor Temple, located on the Northwest side of the village. There is three Nasrani Churches in this small village, The oldest one is St George's Syro-Malabar Church established in 1850 A.D. New church was constructed in 2000 AD . Other Syro-Malabar Churches are St Thomas Church Kumaramchira and Marth Mariam  Church Mariyakari(Koventhappalli).   There is one Mar Thoma Church as well.

The road through Muttar helps people to reach easily to the religious destination 'Chakulathukavu' Temple.

Schools

The Govt. UP school, and St. George Higher Secondary School, which are more than 75 years old, are the main educational institutes in the village.
 
A newly started institution in Muttar is the Christ City School (CBSE Curriculum), an institution run by the Carmelites of Mary Immaculate (CMI) Fathers.
 
St Joseph Mission Hospital is at the heart of the Muttar village.

Muttar was one of the first villages in Alappuzha district to achieve 100% literacy.

Economy
Agriculture is the main revenue source of the village.  The main crops are  rice, coconut, banana, mango etc. The villagers also engage in fishing as a source of revenue and as entertainment.

Demographics
As per census 2011, the population of the village is 9200 out of which 4437 males and 4763 females.

References 

Villages in Alappuzha district